In Freudian psychology, externalization is an unconscious defense mechanism by which an individual projects their own internal characteristics onto the outside world. It may refer to:

 Externalization (migration), efforts by countries to prevent migrants reaching their borders
 Externalization (psychology)
 External memory (psychology)
 Cost externalization, the socioeconomic practice of maximizing profits by off-loading indirect costs and forcing negative effects to a third party
 Sound externalization, see virtual acoustic space
 Externalization in economics
 Cost externalization
 Externality

See also
External (disambiguation)
Externalizing disorder